Edward John Eyre made two expeditions into the interior of South Australia in 1839. At the time nobody had been any further than the head of Spencer Gulf. The first expedition, in May, set out from Adelaide. It is not exactly clear how far north he reached before turning back, but somewhere in the Flinders Ranges. The second expedition, in August, sailed to Port Lincoln, and struck out west following the coast to Streaky Bay. Forced back again by inhospitable conditions, he went east and then further north than the previous attempt, eventually finding the lake that is now called Lake Torrens.

Eyre made a third trip north in June 1840, this time reaching what is now known as Lake Eyre. A fourth trip began in February 1841, this time determined to reach Western Australia. The trek began at Fowlers Bay and reached Albany in July, a trip of 1600 km (1000 miles).

North
Having made a tidy profit of several thousand pounds from his second overlanding trip, the young Eyre (then only twenty-three years old) turned his attention to the interior, and the speculation surrounding the possibility of an inland sea. Planning a three-month expedition to the head of the Spencer Gulf, he left Adelaide with five other men on May 1, 1839, taking two drays and travelling north for the coastal plain west of the Flinders Ranges. He named the Broughton River after William Broughton, the Anglican Bishop of Australia, and proceeded northward past the head of the gulf to establish camp halfway between The Dutchmans Stern and Mount Arden at a small creek with permanent springs in it: he named this Depot Creek and was to return to it several times in future years.

From this camp he espied a low range of hills to the west, and sent his companion John Baxter to investigate - this range he later named the Baxter Range; it lies north of the town of Iron Knob. Eyre himself set off north along the margin of the Flinders. Finding little water (the pools of water in Willochra Creek were salty), he made for a hill some 30 km north-west of the later town of Hawker. From the summit he had his first view of Lake Torrens; he later wrote that it "seemed to be water", but he realised it was merely the "dry and glazed bed of where water had lodged" - a salt lake. To the north-east he noted that the ranges continued; "tier behind tier of very rocky appearance as far as the eye could reach". This was almost certainly the first time that a European had glimpsed the peaks of Wilpena Pound.

After returning to camp and a brief foray 50 km down the western side of Spencer Gulf with Baxter, Eyre decided to return southwards. He was dissatisfied with the saltbush country (as he described it, "sandy desert interspersed with scrub"), not realising the grazing potential of the saltbush.

On his return trip he turned east after leaving the Flinders behind and instead travelled back to Adelaide down the River Murray, reaching home on June 29. The Governor soon named his northernmost point Mount Eyre.

West and north again
Restless, Eyre dallied little before setting sail for Port Lincoln on his 24th birthday, 5 August 1839. His small party travelled along the coast to the vicinity of Streaky Bay before Eyre struck out alone with an Aboriginal companion. It was during this trip that they passed Lake Newland, which Eyre named after his friend Richard Francis Newland.

Eyre then led his party across country back to the head of Spencer Gulf and their old campsite at Depot Creek, visiting and naming the Gawler Ranges (for the Governor) on the way. Determined to explore farther, he travelled north alone, this time going about  farther than Mount Eyre, reaching a peak a little south-west of modern-day Leigh Creek. From here he saw that Lake Torrens was now filled with water, but it still blocked his path. He was compelled to return, being without any support. Back at camp he conferred with Baxter, whom he had sent east.

Eyre returned to Adelaide directly, visiting and giving glowing reports of what was to become the Clare Valley.

Notes

References
 Mincham, Hans (1964), The Story of the Flinders Ranges, Adelaide: Rigby Publishers.
 Historical Records of Australia, Series I, Volume XX, p. 875: Note 151.

Australian expeditions
Exploration of Australia
History of South Australia
Lake Eyre basin
1839 in Australia